The 2012–13 Ligakupa was the sixth edition of the Hungarian League Cup, the Ligakupa.

Group stage

Group A

Group B

Group C

Group D

Group E

Quarter-finals
The five winners and 3 seconds placed of the previous round were drawn into five group matches. The winners on aggregate advanced to the next round. The first leg were played on 20 February, the second leg were played on 6 March 2012.

Semi-finals
The first leg will be played on 20 and 21 March, the second leg will be played on 23 and 24 March 2012.

Final

External links
 soccerway.com
 worldfootball.com

2012–13 in Hungarian football
2012–13 domestic association football cups
2012-13